The 2013–14 LNB Pro B season was the 27th season of the Pro B, the France second basketball tier, organised by the LNB. SOMB Boulogne-sur-Mer won the league championship, after finishing first in the regular season with 32 wins. SOMB promoted to the Pro A along with Playoffs winner JL Bourg-en-Bresse and wild card receivers SPO Rouen Reims Champagne.

Regular season
All teams played each other twice, once at home and once away. After this, all teams played all teams in their geographic poule at home and away.

Standings

Promotion playoffs
The eight highest placed from the regular season with exception of the champions qualified for the promotion playoffs. In all rounds a best-of-three format was used. JL Bourg promoted to the 2014–15 Pro A season as the winner of the promotion playoffs.

Individual awards

Notes

References

2013–14 in European second tier basketball leagues
LNB Pro B
2013-14